Six Hearts Princess (Japanese: シックスハートプリンセス, Shikkusuhātopurinsesu), also known as 6HP, 6♡Princess, and Six♡Princess, is a magical girl anime television series created by Takashi Murakami with character designs by mebae. The first episode aired unfinished on Tokyo MX on December 30, 2016 and aired again in a finished state on September 29, 2017. 6 more episodes have aired sporadically over time as of September 2020. There are 15 episodes planned. The series' motifs are eight values matching the ones central to Nansō Satomi Hakkenden - Jin (benevolence), Gi (justice), Rei (politeness), Chi (wisdom), Chuu (loyalty), Shin (faith), Kou (filial piety), and Tei (respect), the Kanji for which are included in the corresponding characters' surnames.

History 
Six Hearts Princess was first conceived as an animated short that was exhibited at creator Takashi Murakami's exhibition "MURAKAMI VERSAILLES" at the Palace of Versailles in 2010. The short mimicked an opening theme, ending theme, and next-episode preview for an (at-the-time) nonexistent anime series. Many conceptual differences exist between this early version and later iterations; for one, the early version only included three on-screen princesses: Pink, Yellow, and Blue.

In 2013, Murakami collaborated with cosmetics brand Shu Uemura. This collaboration included a Six Hearts Princess-themed commercial set to the Vocaloid song Pink or Black by kz of Livetune. The commercial marked the first appearance of Black Princess- part of the campaign's theme involved Pink Princess and Black Princess as foils representing, among other things, fantasy versus reality and good versus naughty. At the time of the collaboration, 6HP was described as an 'upcoming animated series'.

From late 2013 to 2015, four cosplay performances- titled 6HP Ki, 6HP Sho, 6HP Ten, and 6HP Yui- were held to promote the series. As of the final performance in 2015, it was reportedly in production. The performances and the visuals created for them contained two characters not seen in any other 6HP media to date- Yukiko Nekozuka and Risako Inukai, the evil 'dark heart princesses'. Also featured was Kyoko Takatomi, White Princess, whose status in the newest iteration is still uncertain.

The pilot episode aired in 2016 as promised; its plot, like those of each of the iterations before it, differed heavily from the final version. Production on the full series started afterwards. When the first episode was released, it was unfinished, and an apology message from Murakami was appended to it along with a documentary segment on the series' production. Following episodes would also be aired alongside documentaries; a documentary appended to a re-airing of the pilot revealed that it was originally supposed to be partially or entirely 2D rather than CGI.

Plot
The isolated town of Hinomori is the last outpost in a destroyed world. It's repeatedly attacked by 'beasts of sin'/Zaiju, and is protected by the legendary Heart Princesses, who are responsible for its continued survival. A young, ditzy girl named Haruka Hani, whose dream is to become a Heart Princess, is asked to join their ranks by a creature called a Moon Cat. She saves her best friend, Tamaki Teijou, from an attacking Zaiju in the second episode.

As the series continues, references are made to a conflict between two species, the Moon Cats, colorful cats who transform girls into Princesses, and the Earth Wolves, the main antagonists of the series. A group of Earth Wolves in human form attend the same school as the Princesses and are responsible for summoning Zaiju.

Later, Ami Gido, a girl who works at her family's Chinese restaurant, becomes Blue Princess, and Yukari Mure, a glasses-wearing girl, becomes Yellow Princess. Three others are introduced- Megumi Daishin/ Gold Princess, Kanade Chidori/ Purple Princess, and Makoto Yoshitada/ Green Princess.

In episode 6, Tamaki is transformed into Black Princess, but she's turned into a Zaiju in the middle of the process and begins attacking the others.

Characters

Heart Princesses 
The Heart Princesses are girls who are recruited by the Moon Cats in order to protect Hinomori. When a girl gets her Heart princess identity, she receives a peony mark somewhere on her body in her signature color.

Haruka Hani (羽仁 はるか, Hani Haruka) / Pink Princess

A cheerful, peppy, 14-year-old girl. She wears her pink hair in twintails. The virtue she represents is Jin and her peony mark is on her chest. Her parents are almost never home, so she lives alone most of the time. Her best friend as of episode 1 is Tamaki Teijou. She has a strange dream about a cat village towards the beginning of the first episode and is immediately inspired to begin writing a play, as she's in the school drama club. Her Moon Cat counterpart is Jin. She's the first main character to become a Princess on screen.

Ami Gidou (義堂 あみ, Gidou Ami) / Blue Princess

A girl who works to support her parents and their restaurant. She has blue as a signature color. She's characterized as loyal and hardworking and becomes a Princess in episode 3, the second character to do so on screen. Her Moon Cat counterpart and virtue are Gi. Her peony mark is on her back.

Yukari Mure (牟礼 ゆかり, Mure Yukari) / Yellow Princess

A girl forced to become a Princess in order to save the others. She wears glasses in her civilian form. Rei is her Moon Cat counterpart/virtue, and her peony mark is on her right thigh.

Megumi Daishin (大信 めぐみ, Daishin Megumi) / Gold Princess

One of three known high-school aged princesses. Megumi is suspicious of the Moon Cats. Her peony mark is on her right eye, and her Moon Cat counterpart is Shin. The virtue she represents is Shin as well.

Kanade Chidori (智鳥 かなで, Chidori Kanade) / Purple Princess

Kanade is a tomboy, and one of the high school Princesses along with Megumi and Makoto. She's the only Princess who wears a boys' school uniform, as well as the only one with a dark skin-tone. Her personal Moon Cat is Chi, as is her virtue. Her peony mark is on her forehead.

Makoto Yoshitada (吉忠 まこと, Yoshitada Makoto) / Green Princess

Makoto is one of the three high-school princesses. She speaks in the Kansai dialect, loves puns, and is particularly energetic. Her peony mark is formed by both of her forearms, her corresponding virtue (and corresponding moon cat) is Chuu.

Antagonists 
Fusanosuke Hoegami (吠上 房之助, Hoegami Fusanosuke)

Fusanosuke is an Earth Wolf boy who's known Tamaki since she first came into town. He's hostile towards the Heart Princesses, but friends with Tamaki nonetheless. He appears to be the leader of the Earth Wolf group at Hinomori Academy Middle School.

Shijou Kagiriko (嗅霧湖 四条, Kagiriko Shijou)

An androgynous boy who wears his hair in a bob. He attends Hinomori Academy Middle School along with the Princesses and other Earth Wolves.

Rokkaku Tsumadaru (爪陀琉 六角, Tsumadaru Rokkaku)

A blue-haired, glasses-wearing Earth Wolf who functions as the brains of the group. He has a nerdy personality and a crush on Blue Princess, despite the fact that they're enemies.

Wan Gasaragi (牙更城 王, Gasaragi Wan)

An Earth Wolf who frequently provokes the Heart Princesses. He appears to be older than the other three, and has an aloof personality.

Tamaki Teijou (悌上 たまき, Teijou Tamaki) / Black Princess

Haruka's best friend. Tamaki has black hair in a bob and is characterized by her shyness and gentleness. She evacuated to Hinomori city as a young orphan, and met Fusanosuke, an Earth Wolf, in the process. Her peony mark is on her lower abdomen. The virtue she represents (and the name of her Moon Cat counterpart) is Tei. She's in the same drama club as Haruka. However, while receiving her mark, she was turned evil. Out of the currently introduced main characters, Tamaki is the last to become a Princess.

Episode list

References 

Japanese animated television series
Magical girl anime and manga